Ali Hamdemir (born 1 May 1989) is an Austrian footballer who plays as a midfielder for OÖ Liga club ASKÖ Oedt.

Honours
Pasching
Austrian Cup: 2012–13

References

1989 births
Living people
Austrian people of Turkish descent
Turkish footballers
Austrian footballers
LASK players
Association football midfielders
Austrian Landesliga players
FC Blau-Weiß Linz players
FC Juniors OÖ players
SK Austria Klagenfurt players